Flaugnarde also known as flagnarde, flognarde or flougnarde, is a baked French dessert with fruit arranged in a buttered dish and covered with a thick flan-like batter. Similar to a clafoutis, which is made with black cherries, a flaugnarde is made with apples, peaches, pears, plums, prunes or other fruits. Resembling a sweet batter pudding or large pancake, the dish is dusted with confectioner's sugar and can be served either warm or cold.

Origins
The name is derived from the Occitan words fleunhe and flaunhard, which both translate as "soft" or "downy". The dish is common in the Auvergne, Limousin and Périgord regions of France.

Gallery

See also
Pannenkoek, the large Dutch pancake that often includes fruits

References

Occitan desserts
French desserts
Custard desserts
Fruit dishes